Live at Mile High Music Festival is a live album by the Dave Matthews Band from the 2008 Mile High Music Festival outside Denver, Colorado. In its first week of sales, the album debuted at #97 on the US charts. The concert featured many old songs such as "Don't Drink the Water", "Two Step" and "#41", as well as more recent songs such as "Corn Bread" and "Eh Hee".

This is the first album to be released by the band without saxophonist LeRoi Moore and the first to feature Bela Fleck and the Flecktones saxophonist Jeff Coffin for the entire set.  Coffin stepped in for Moore after he was injured in an ATV accident. Moore died on August 19, 2008, from pneumonia, almost a month after this performance.

Tim Reynolds also sat in as a guest for the complete set, as he did throughout the 2008 summer tour.

It was released on Tuesday December 16, 2008.

CD track listing 
All songs were written by David J. Matthews unless noted.

Disc One

 "Don't Drink the Water" – 7:13
 "You Might Die Trying" – 7:29
 "Eh Hee" – 4:25
 "Two Step" – 14:05
 "Proudest Monkey" » – 8:10
 "Satellite" – 5:07
 "Corn Bread" – 6:42

Disc Two

 "Sledgehammer" (Peter Gabriel) – 5:55
 "Stay (Wasting Time)" – 6:53
 "Old Dirt Hill (Bring That Beat Back)" – 5:12
 "Jimi Thing" – 14:57
 "#41" – 15:11
 "Tripping Billies" – 6:38
 "So Damn Lucky" - 8:09

Disc Three

 "So Much to Say" » – 5:46
 "Anyone Seen the Bridge?" » – 1:59
 "Too Much"» – 5:10
 "Ants Marching" – 8:50
 "Gravedigger" – 4:49
 "Louisiana Bayou" – 7:30
 "Thank You (Falettinme Be Mice Elf Agin)" (Sly & The Family Stone) – 8:17

Personnel
Dave Matthews Band
Dave Matthews - guitars, lead vocals
Boyd Tinsley - violins, backing vocals

Stefan Lessard - bass
Carter Beauford - drums, percussion, backing vocals
With Guests
Jeff Coffin - saxophones
Rashawn Ross - trumpet, flugelhorn, backing vocals
Tim Reynolds - guitar

References 

Dave Matthews Band live albums
2008 live albums

pl:Live at Piedmont Park